Herpetogramma fuscescens is a moth in the family Crambidae. It was described by William Warren in 1892. It is found in Japan.

References

Moths described in 1892
Herpetogramma
Moths of Japan